King Cotton is a 1947 historical novel by the British writer Thomas Armstrong. It focuses on Lancashire in the 1850s and 1850s and the cotton mills that turned raw cotton imported from the American South into textiles. It takes its title from the slogan of King Cotton a popular boast about the economic power that the lucrative crop gave to the southerners in their dispute with the North.

The novel portrays the hardships caused to the mill communities of northern England, by the Union Blockade  during the American Civil War preventing supplies of cotton from reaching Liverpool. Despite their difficulties there is broad support amongst the workers for the Abolitionist cause.

References

Bibliography
 Knight, Rolf. Traces of Magma: An Annotated Bibliography of Left Literature. Draegerman, 1983
 Russell, Dave. Looking North: Northern England and the National Imagination. Manchester University Press, 2004.
 Snell, Keith. The Bibliography of Regional Fiction in Britain and Ireland, 1800–2000. Routledge, 2017.
 Turner, Herbert. Trade Union Growth, Structure and Policy: A Comparative Study of the Cotton Unions. University of Toronto Press, 1962.

1947 British novels
Novels by Thomas Armstrong
Novels set in Lancashire
Novels set in Liverpool
British historical novels
Novels set in the 1850s
Novels set in the 1860s
William Collins, Sons books